Jersey Boy is the twelfth studio album by American country music artist Eddie Rabbitt. It was released in 1990 by Capitol Records. The album produced five singles including "On Second Thought", the final number one country hit of Rabbitt's career, and "American Boy", which became a popular song among American soldiers and citizens during the Gulf War.

Jersey Boy reached number 34 on country album charts. Allmusic gave the album four out of five stars citing the tracks "Only One Love in My Life", "Feel Like a Stranger" and "Tennessee Born and Bred" as songs "that Eddie Rabbitt fans might especially enjoy."

Track listing

Chart performance

Album

Singles

References

1990 albums
Eddie Rabbitt albums
Capitol Records albums
Albums produced by Richard Landis